St John's Church, Kidderminster is a Church of England parish church in Kidderminster, Worcestershire, England. The church is a Grade II listed building.

History
The first St John the Baptist Church was built between 1842 and 1843 to designs by the architect George Alexander. It was known locally as the 'Black Church'. It was created as a parish in 1867 out of that of St Mary and All Saints' Church, Kidderminster.

The present church was rebuilt between 1892 and 1904 by J. A. Chatwin and incorporated the tower and spire of the earlier church, and was consecrated by the Bishop of Worcester Charles Gore on 13 February 1904.

In 1972 offices and vestries were constructed within the nave by Burman Goodall & Partners. The refectory and children's room were added then and the organ was moved to the west end of the nave over the refectory.

Vicars

Revd Melsup Hill 1844 - 1857
Revd George Kewley 1858 - 1882
Canon John Kershaw 1882 - 1911
Revd R. Stephenson 1911 - 1920
Revd R. Bertie Roberts 1920 - 1936
Revd J.H. Balmforth 1937 - 1943
Canon Hugh Roberts 1943 - 1952
Revd Arthur Trippass 1952 - 1960
Revd Anthony Balmforth 1960 - 1966
Revd Alan Doyle 1966 - 1967
Revd Derek Barratt 1967 - 1978
Revd M H Stagg 1978 - 1980
Revd F. Hillebrand 1980 - 1991 (team rector from 1990)
Revd Charles Raven 1990-2000
Revd G. Smith 1991 - 2000
Revd H Goddard 2000 - 2009
Revd D. Arnold 2009 - 2014
Fr Tim Williams 2015-present

Organ
The organ dates from 1909 by Nicholson and Co. of Worcester. A specification of the organ can be found on the National Pipe Organ Register.

Organists

William Taylor until 1868 (afterwards organist at St Mary and All Saints' Church, Kidderminster)
George Arthur Hardacre 1868 - 1869
G.E. Blunden 1869 - 1877
William Edward Wadely 1877 - 1943 (formerly organist at Tamworth Parish Church)

Clock
In 1856 St Mary’s Church was installing a new clock and gave the old one built by Henry Knight of Birmingham and dating from 1828 to St John’s. It was installed in St John’s in October 1856 with new dials by voluntary subscription and was a great benefit to the residents of the area.

References

Church of England church buildings in Worcestershire
Grade II listed churches in Worcestershire
Churches completed in 1843
1843 establishments in England
Buildings and structures in Kidderminster